The 10th Dáil was elected at the 1938 general election on 17 June 1938 and first met on 30 June 1938. The members of Dáil Éireann, the house of representatives of the Oireachtas (legislature) of Ireland, are known as TDs.

The 10th Dáil is the longest serving Dáil, lasting  days. The Dáil adjourned on 26 May 1943 and on 31 May President Douglas Hyde called a general election for 17 June at the request of the Taoiseach Éamon de Valera. Exceptionally, the outgoing Dáil was not dissolved until 26 June, after the election. Although the Constitution requires the President to dissolve the Dáil before a general election, this procedure was overridden by the General Elections (Emergency Provisions) Act 1943. The act, which would have been unconstitutional if not for the state of emergency in effect during World War II, was intended to increase national security by minimising the interval during which no Dáil was in existence.

Composition of the 10th Dáil

Government party denoted with bullet

Graphical representation
This is a graphical comparison of party strengths in the 10th Dáil from June 1938. This was not the official seating plan.

Ceann Comhairle
On 30 June 1938, Frank Fahy (FF), who had served as Ceann Comhairle since 1932, was proposed by Éamon de Valera and seconded by Donnchadh Ó Briain for the position, and was elected without a vote.

TDs by constituency
The list of the 138 TDs by Dáil constituency.

Changes

See also
Members of the 3rd Seanad

References

External links
Houses of the Oireachtas: Debates: 10th Dáil

 
10
10th Dáil